Dimitar Dimitrov (born 10 November 1989) is a Bulgarian footballer, currently playing for Slivnishki Geroy. He comes from Levski Sofia's Youth Academy.

Career

PFC Levski Sofia
Dimitrov is a youth of PFC Levski Sofia. He made his official debut for Levski's senior team on 13 June 2009 in a match against Pirin Blagoevgrad.

FC Spartak Ploviv
On 27 June 2009 it was announced that Dimitrov would be play on loan for FC Spartak Plovdiv during 2009–10 season.

As of the mid of 2009–10 season, Dimitrov already capped 9 times for Spartak.

FC Slivnishki geroi (Slivnitsa)
In July 2011 joined the team Slivnishki geroi, and briefly became a major player.

In the 2010–11 season the team received promotion for West B PFG and Dimitrov signed a two-year professional contract with the club.

External links
 Dimitrov at Levski's site
 Dimitrov at Sportal.bg

Bulgarian footballers
1989 births
Living people
First Professional Football League (Bulgaria) players
PFC Levski Sofia players
FC Spartak Plovdiv players
Association football defenders